The 1924 Minnesota gubernatorial election took place on November 4, 1924. Republican Party of Minnesota candidate Theodore Christianson defeated Farmer–Labor Party challenger Floyd B. Olson. George E. Leach, Julius A. Schmahl, and Franklin Ellsworth unsuccessfully ran for the Republican nomination.

Results

See also
 List of Minnesota gubernatorial elections

External links
 http://www.sos.state.mn.us/home/index.asp?page=653
 http://www.sos.state.mn.us/home/index.asp?page=657

Gubernatorial
1924
Minnesota
November 1924 events